No. 13 Group was a group in the Royal Air Force for various periods in the 20th century. It is most famous for having the responsibility for defending the North of the United Kingdom during the Battle of Britain.

First World Wa
No. 13 Group RAF was first formed on 1 April 1918 within No. 3 Area. It was quickly transferred to Midland Area on 8 May of that year. On 18 October 1919 the Group's first existence came to an end when it was disbanded by folding it into No. 3 Group.

Second World War

Preparations for War
As Fighter Command expanded prior to the Second World War, it was seen that a new Group was needed to command the air defences of Scotland, Northern Ireland, and the north of England. 13 Group was duly reformed in September 1939. During the initial stages of World War II, No. 13 Group was Commanded by Air Vice Marshal Richard Saul.

The Dowding System in 13 Group
Like the other groups into which fighter command were divided, No. 13 Group operated the Dowding system of fighter control. The 13 Group HQ was at Kenton, near Newcastle upon Tyne with the Filter Room at nearby Blakelaw Quarry. The sector airfields were:

RAF Acklington
RAF Dyce
RAF Inverness
RAF Turnhouse
RAF Usworth
RAF Wick

Stations
Besides the sector airfields, between 1940 and 1944, No. 13 Group used the following assets in its operations. The letter A after a station name denotes an airfield, and a R denotes a radar site that fed information into the group headquarters.

RAF Acklington A
RAF Aldergrove A
RAF Anstruther R
RAF Ayr A
RAF Bamburgh R
RAF Blakelaw HQ
RAF Castletown A
RAF Catterick A
RAF Church Fenton A
RAF Cockburnspath R
RAF Cresswell R
RAF Dalcross HQ
RAF Danby Beacon R
RAF Doonies Hill R
RAF Douglas Wood
RAF Drem A
RAF Drone Hill R
RAF Dyce A
RAF Fair Isle R
RAF Grangemouth A
RAF Hillhead R
RAF Inverness HQ
RAF Leconfield A
RAF Leeming A
RAF Netherbutton R
RAF Ottercops Moss R
RAF Ouston A
RAF Prestwick A
RAF Rosehearty R
RAF St Cyrus R
RAF Schoolhill R
RAF Shotton R
RAF Skeabrae A
RAF Sumburgh A
RAF Thrumster R
RAF Turnhouse A
RAF Usworth A
RAF Wick A

Battle of Britain
As well as guarding the north during the Battle of Britain, 13 Group also provided reserve squadrons and pilots to the more beleaguered 11 Group, and provided quieter bases for squadrons to recuperate from operations.

The 13 Group also contributed to pilot education by producing its "Forget-Me-Nots for Fighters" brochure that included a foreword by Air Vice-Marshal R. E. Saul.

During the Battle of Britain, the Germans had faulty intelligence indicating that 13 Group had next to no fighters in operation (they believed that the only reason why 11 Group was still holding out was that 13 Group had been sending them down their available aircraft), so they had thought that any attacks made on Scotland would not face any serious resistance. This proved to be a costly mistake for the Luftwaffe, as their bombers were intercepted by a large number of fighters. The bombers could not be escorted all the way to Scotland from Occupied Europe because of the short range of the Messerschmitt Bf 109, so the attacking bombers proved to be fodder for Saul's Spitfire and Hurricane squadrons. On 15 August  1940 the German air force attempted its one and only daylight flank attack on Northern England. North East England was attacked by 65 Heinkel He 111s escorted by 34 Messerschmitt Bf 110s, and RAF Driffield was attacked by 50 unescorted Junkers Ju 88s. Out of 115 bombers and 35 fighters sent over, 16 bombers and 7 fighters were destroyed.

Post Battle of Britain
After the Battle of Britain, 13 Group squadrons helped RAF Coastal Command in patrolling for U-boats and providing air cover for convoys. New pilots would usually find themselves posted to a 13 Group squadron initially so as to gain experience with lesser risk of getting shot down.

In June of 1943, No. 32 Wing of RAF Army Cooperation Command was transferred to 13 Group, and so brought with it three further airfields to operate from; Macmerry, Kirknewton and Findo Gask. In July 1943, No. 14 Group was disbanded, and its assets and the area it covered, were absorbed into No. 13 Group. In August of the same year, the headquarters element was moved from Newcastle in England, to Inverness in Scotland.

Post war
In November 1945, the headquarters moved again to RAF Dalcross in Scotland. At that time the group had responsibility for five squadrons at two stations; No.s 91, 122 and 316 at RAF Wick, and No.s 164 and 303 at RAF Turnhouse. No. 13 Group was disbanded on 20 May 1946. However, nine years later, on 4 April 1955, it was reformed at RAF Watnall, again in a fighter role. It finally disbanded on 31 December 1961 when it was redesignated No. 11 Group.

Commanders
The following officers had command of No. 13 Group:

1918 to 1919
1 April 1918  Unknown

1939 to 1946
24 July 1939 Air Vice-Marshal Richard Ernest Saul
4 February 1941 Air Vice-Marshal John Oliver Andrews
27 November 1942 Air Vice-Marshal Malcolm Henderson
15 November 1943 Air Vice-Marshal Stanley Flamank Vincent
26 January 1944 Air Commodore John Auguste Boret
3 May 1945 1945 Air Commodore T B Prickman

1955 to 1961
16 May 1955 Air Vice-Marshal Walter Graemes Cheshire
1 July 1957 Air Vice-Marshal Alfred Earle
9 November 1959 Air Vice-Marshal Harold John Maguire

See also
 RAF Fighter Command
 Battle of Britain
 List of Battle of Britain airfields
 List of Battle of Britain squadrons

References

Sources

013 Group RAF
Battle of Britain
013
1918 establishments in the United Kingdom
Military units and formations established in 1918
Military units and formations disestablished in 1961